Polaco is surname of:
 Jorge Polaco (1946–2014), an Argentine filmmaker
 Peter Polaco, better known as Justin Credible (born 1973), American professional wrestler
 Pico Polaco, a mountain in the Cordillera de la Ramada range of the Andes of Argentina
 Lito & Polaco, Rafael Sierra (Lito) (born 1979) and Rafael Omar Polaco Molina (Polaco) (born 1976)

See also 
 Idioma polaco
 Glaciar de los Polacos
 Polacco (Italian form)
 Polacca - a type of merchant sailing vessel
 Polaco (slur) - a Spanish derogatory term for a Catalan

Spanish-language surnames
Surnames of Polish origin